Asoscion Deprtivo El Paraiso  is a Salvadoran professional football club based in El Paraiso,  Chalatenango, El Salvador.

The club currently plays in the Tercera Division de Fútbol Salvadoreño.

The club was founded in 2016.

References

Football clubs in El Salvador
Association football clubs established in 2016
2016 establishments in North America